Jamie Mackintosh (born 20 February 1985) is a New Zealand professional rugby union player currently playing for the Austin Gilgronis in Major League Rugby (MLR).

He previously played for Section Paloise in the French Top 14 competition. He was also selected for the All Blacks 2008 End of year tour to travel to Hong Kong and Britain. Mackintosh grew up in Fortrose, 50 minutes south east of Invercargill and played for the Tokanui Rugby Club's junior sides. He attended Southland Boys' High School.

Domestic career

Southland
Jamie Mackintosh played his first match for Southland in 2004 when he came off the bench against Waikato. He played in eight games in the NPC that year, starting in two of them. In 2006, Mackintosh started in all eight of the games he played. For the 2007 season, he went two better, and played in ten matches, starting in all of them, and enjoyed wins over Otago, Bay of Plenty and Manawatu. Mackintosh was a long-standing fixture for the Southland Stags, up until his surprising omission from the 2016 squad. Having earned 123 caps for the team, the peak of his accomplishments was helping bring the Ranfurly Shield back to Southland in 2009, breaking a drought of 50 years in doing so. Mackintosh was also a member of the 2011 team that re-captured the shield for a second time in the team's modern history.

Super Rugby

In 2007, Mackintosh was called into the Highlanders squad, where he played in three matches, all of them off the bench. In 2008, Mackintosh played in eleven Highlanders matches. He also scored two tries and received two yellow cards. He remained with the Highlanders until 2013, captaining the team for the 2010 and 2011 seasons.

Top 14 
During the autumn 2015, Mackintosh joined the Top 14 side Montpellier. In 2016, Mackintosh returned to the Top 14 competition with Section Paloise.

PRO Rugby
In March 2016, Mackintosh joined the American newly formed PRO Rugby competition with the Ohio Aviators. He played in the competition's only season before returning to France.

International career
On Sunday, 26 October 2008, after a successful year with Southland making the semi-finals of the Air New Zealand Cup for the first time, he was named in the All Blacks squad to tour Europe in November of that year. He started in two matches for the All Blacks, the 32–6 victory in the test against Scotland and a full 80 minutes in the hard-fought 18–16 win against Munster.  He did not appear again for the New Zealand team.

References

External links
Highlanders profile
Audio Interview with the New Zealand Herald
Video of Whopper scoring a try for Pau
Falcon, courtesy of Jimmy Cowan.

1985 births
New Zealand international rugby union players
People educated at Southland Boys' High School
Highlanders (rugby union) players
Southland rugby union players
Chiefs (rugby union) players
Living people
New Zealand rugby union players
Rugby union players from Invercargill
Rugby union props
Barbarian F.C. players
Ohio Aviators players
Montpellier Hérault Rugby players
Section Paloise players
Austin Gilgronis players
Otago rugby union players